is a Japanese skier. She competed in Alpine skiing at the 1988, 1992 and the 1994 Winter Olympics. She is the only female Japanese skier to finish on the podium of an Alpine World Cup race, placing third in a downhill race at St. Anton, Austria, on 18 December 1993.

References

1970 births
Living people
Alpine skiers at the 1988 Winter Olympics
Alpine skiers at the 1992 Winter Olympics
Alpine skiers at the 1994 Winter Olympics
Japanese female alpine skiers
Olympic alpine skiers of Japan
Place of birth missing (living people)
20th-century Japanese women